Philipp Friedrich von Hetsch (10 September 1758, Stuttgart - 31 December 1838, Stuttgart) was a German Classical painter, known primarily for his portraits, although he also created historical and mythological scenes.

Biography 
His father was a musician at the court in Württemberg. At the age of thirteen, without the knowledge of his parents, he applied and was accepted at the Karlsschule Stuttgart Karlsschule, where he studied with the painters Nicolas Guibal and Adolf Friedrich Harper. Originally, he focused on landscape painting. His love of the theater brought him into contact and eventually a friendship with Friedrich Schiller.

With the approval of his instructors, at the age of 22, he went to Paris, where he was accepted as a student by Joseph Marie Vien and Claude Joseph Vernet. Later that year, was appointed a court painter to Charles Eugene, Duke of Württemberg. He returned to Stuttgart after two years.

In 1785, with financial support from the court, he was able to undertake further studies in Rome, where he spent time copying the Old Masters. He became a Professor at the Karlsschule in 1790 but, after the death of Duke Charles, the school was disbanded.<Wolfgang Kermer: Daten und Bilder zur Geschichte der Staatlichen Akademie der Bildenden Künste Stuttgart. Stuttgart: Edition Cantz, 1988.</ref> In 1798, Hetsch was able to replace Harper as the Director of the Ducal Picture Gallery; holding that position until 1816.

In 1808, he was awarded the Knight's Cross of the Order of the Crown, which entitled him to add a non-hereditary "von" to his name.

In 1787, he married Louise Scholl (1766-1800), the daughter of a church councilor. Four of their five children died young. The surviving son became the architect, Gustav Friedrich Hetsch. After her death, he married Charlotte Fischer (1778–1826), daughter of the  Hofbaumeister (court builder) Reinhard Heinrich Ferdinand Fischer. They had one son.

Selected portraits

References

Further reading
 Werner Fleischhauer: Philipp Friedrich Hetsch - Ein Beitrag zur Kunstgeschichte Württembergs. Hugo Matthaes Verlag, Stuttgart 1929

External links 

ArtNet: More works by Von Hetsch.

18th-century German painters
18th-century German male artists
German male painters
19th-century German painters
19th-century German male artists
Artists from Stuttgart
1758 births
1839 deaths
German portrait painters
Court painters